Pool-type reactor can mean:

 A water-cooled Swimming pool reactor
 A Sodium-cooled fast reactor of the pool rather than loop type